Paulo Ricardo Moroni, known as Moroni (born 29 August 1961), is a former Brazilian football player.

He played 5 seasons and 116 games in the Primeira Liga for Braga.

Club career
He made his Primeira Liga debut for Braga on 13 December 1987 as a starter in a 1–1 draw against Marítimo.

References

1961 births
Living people
People from Santa Rosa, Rio Grande do Sul
Brazilian footballers
Association football defenders
Esporte Clube Internacional players
Guarani FC players
CR Vasco da Gama players
S.C. Braga players
Brazilian expatriate footballers
Expatriate footballers in Portugal
Brazilian expatriate sportspeople in Portugal
Primeira Liga players
A.D. Ovarense players
Liga Portugal 2 players
Mogi Mirim Esporte Clube players
Futebol Clube Santa Cruz players
Sportspeople from Rio Grande do Sul